The 1915 Saint Louis Billikens football team was an American football team that represented Saint Louis University during the 1915 college football season. In their first and only season under head coach George Keogan, the Billikens compiled a 4–3–1 record and outscored opponents by a total of 142 to 122. The team played its home games at Sportsman's Park at St. Louis.

Schedule

References

Saint Louis
Saint Louis Billikens football seasons
Saint Louis Billikens football